Benidorm Club de Fútbol was a Spanish football team based in Benidorm, in the autonomous community of Valencia. Founded in 1964 and dissolved in 2011 it held home matches at Estadio Municipal Guillermo Amor, which had a capacity of 6,000.

History
Benidorm was folded in June 2011, 47 years after its creation. Liquidation befell due to the high debt generated during past seasons with their players and suppliers.

The club spent 19 seasons in the third division, with two separate seven-year runs in the competition, one in the 90s and another in the 2000s.

Season to season

19 seasons in Segunda División B
14 seasons in Tercera División
14 seasons in Categorías Regionales

Former players

References

External links

Official website 
Futbolme team profile 

Association football clubs established in 1964
Association football clubs disestablished in 2011
Defunct football clubs in the Valencian Community
1964 establishments in Spain
2011 disestablishments in Spain
Benidorm